Farndon is the name of more than one place in England:

Farndon, Cheshire
Farndon, Nottinghamshire
In Northamptonshire:
East Farndon
West Farndon
Fictional village in Nevil Shute's novel No Highway

See also
 Farndon Road, Oxford